Cullen Darome Jenkins (born January 20, 1981) is a former American football defensive end. He was signed by the Green Bay Packers as an undrafted free agent in 2003. In his last year as a Packer, he won Super Bowl XLV over the Pittsburgh Steelers. He played college football at Central Michigan University. He has also played for the Philadelphia Eagles, New York Giants, and Washington Redskins.

Early years
Both he and his brother Kris Jenkins played at Belleville High School under Bob LaPointe.

College career
Jenkins played college football for Central Michigan University, where he recorded 40 tackles, seven tackles for a loss, 4½ sacks, and two passes defensed during his senior year.

Professional career

Green Bay Packers
After going undrafted in the 2003 NFL Draft, Jenkins signed with the Green Bay Packers on May 2, 2003. One year later, after an impressive NFL Europe season and strong training camp, Jenkins landed a spot on the Packers' roster. From 2004 to November 2006, Jenkins was the backup for Kabeer Gbaja-Biamila, and took over the starting role the final month of the 2006 season. As the starter for the last month of games, he recorded a career-high 6½ sacks that year, including his first three-sack game vs. Detroit on December 17, 2006.

On February 26, 2007, Jenkins signed a four-year, $16 million contract extension. Jenkins batted down nine passes in 2007, the most by a Packers defensive lineman since the team began recording the statistic in 1980. He also finished 2007 with 26 total combined tackles and one sack.

In the 2008 season, the Packers decided to start Jenkins rather than Gbaja-Biamila for the second season in a row. He could only play four games though, before he suffered a torn pectoral muscle against the Tampa Bay Buccaneers on September 28, 2008. Two days later, he was placed on injured reserve. During his injury-shorted 2008 year, Jenkins had 13 tackles, 2.5 sacks, a pass defended, and a forced fumble.

In the 2009 season, Jenkins returned as a starting defensive end because the Packers had switched from a 4-3 to a 3-4 defense. Jenkins started all 16 games in 2009 with 32 tackles, 4.5 sacks, a pass defended, an interception, and three forced fumbles.

In the 2010 season Jenkins missed five games with a calf injury. He appeared in 11 games (started six) with 18 total combined tackles, seven sacks, and one pass defended. Jenkins was part of a major role of the Packers' 3-4 defense during their postseason run where they eventually won Super Bowl XLV, their first world championship in 14 years.

Philadelphia Eagles
The Philadelphia Eagles signed Jenkins to a five-year, $25 million contract on July 30, 2011. In 2011, he recorded 5.5 sacks, 24 hurries, and seven tackles-for-loss. He agreed to a restructured contract on February 21, 2012, with the new contract running through the 2014 season instead of the 2015 season. On February 25, 2013, the Eagles declined his roster bonus, making him a free agent.

New York Giants
On March 10, 2013, Jenkins was signed to a three-year contract by the New York Giants.

Washington Redskins
On August 29, 2016, Jenkins signed a one-year contract with the Washington Redskins. After playing one preseason game, he was released on September 3, 2016. He re-signed with the team on September 13.

References

External links
Philadelphia Eagles bio
Green Bay Packers bio

1981 births
Living people
People from Belleville, Michigan
American football defensive tackles
American football defensive ends
Central Michigan Chippewas football players
Cologne Centurions (NFL Europe) players
Green Bay Packers players
Philadelphia Eagles players
Players of American football from Detroit
New York Giants players
Washington Redskins players